A ring flash is a circular light that is often operated with a camera lens in the center to take photographs. Unlike point light sources, a ring flash can illuminate a subject with minimal shadows by closely and evenly surrounding the optical axis of the camera lens. This makes it a popular choice for various types of photography, including macro, portrait and fashion photography. 

Closely related to the ring flash is the continuous ring light, which can produce a consistent level of light for video recording or to see a live preview before capturing photographs. Continuous ring lights are popular for improving picture quality on video calls, social media selfies, and video blogging.  For example, Cornell University offers a photo kiosk equipped with a continuous ring light and iPad to take social media profile pictures for students, faculty, staff, and alumni.

Modern continuous ring lights frequently use light-emitting diodes (LEDs) because they are bright, energy-efficient, and capable of producing quality light.

Ring lights and flashes vary in diameter and thickness, as well as the amount, color temperature, and quality (imperfectly indicated by color rendering index, or CRI) of light output. Some ring lights allow for the adjustment of brightness and color temperature.

History 
The ring flash was first invented by Lester A. Dine in 1952 for use in dental photography.

Construction

A macro ring flash typically consists of a power and control unit mounted on a hot shoe, and a circular flash unit mounted on the front of a lens. Power is supplied by batteries in the shoe-mount unit and a cable conveys power and control signals to the circular flash unit. In larger ring flashes, which are typically used for fashion photography, power may be supplied by an external battery or line power supply, or the power supply and light may be combined in one unit.

Light is usually generated by one or more flash tubes or by multiple LEDs. In some flash units with multiple flash tubes, each flash tube can be independently enabled. Some ring flashes have focusing lenses that result in ideal light distribution at a particular distance from the subject.

Other devices are available that project light in a fashion similar to ring flashes. For example, flash diffusers have no light source of their own, but instead mount in front of a conventional flash unit and transmit the light to a ring-shaped diffuser at the front of the lens. Some other passive light modifiers can shape the light from a conventional shoe-mounted flash into that of a ring flash. These adapters use diffusers and reflectors to "bend" the light in an arc around the lens axis and then emit the light from that arc. These devices maintain any through-the-lens (TTL) lighting functions that are shared by the camera and flash because the timing of the light has not changed.

Applications
Ring flashes are commonly used in macro (close-up) photography. When the subject is very close to the camera, the distance of the flash from the optical axis becomes significant. For objects close to the camera, the size of the ring flash is significant and so the light encounters the subject from many angles in the same way that it does with a conventional flash with soft box. This has the effect of further softening any shadows.

Ring flashes are also popular in portrait and fashion photography because they soften the shadows created by other, off-axis lights, and create interesting circular highlights in a model's eyes. Ring Lights are also often used in the beauty and cosmetic industry, mostly by make-up artists. This is due to the lightweight and compact features of a ring light that make it suitable for freelance beauty and make-up artists. 

Ring flashes are also used in microscopy. The ring flash (usually LED) is mounted on the objective lens of an optical microscope. The main use of this tool is the photographing of microscopic organisms. A ring flash works on a microscope in much the same way as it does on a camera; it reduces reflections while bathing the subject in light.

See also
 Close-up
 Macro photography
 Micrograph

References

External links

Flash photography
Photographic lighting